Twilight: Los Angeles is a 2000 American film directed by Marc Levin and starring Anna Deavere Smith.

Plot
In this film adaptation of the Broadway play, Twilight: Los Angeles, 1992, Anna Deavere Smith performs her one-woman show portraying various real life people involved in the aftermath of the 1992 Rodney King trial verdict riots in Los Angeles. The film is interspersed with additional footage shot in 1999 of Smith following up with some of her interviewees.

References

External links

https://variety.com/2000/film/reviews/twilight-los-angeles-1117778697/

2000 films
American documentary films
American films based on plays
Documentary films about Los Angeles
Films directed by Marc Levin
2000s English-language films
2000s American films